Christian Kieffer was an American politician. He served as the sixth mayor of Lancaster, Pennsylvania from 1852 to 1854.

References

Mayors of Lancaster, Pennsylvania